Uusi means "new" in Finnish and may refer to:

New Student House, Helsinki, student house in Helsinki, Finland, also known as Uusi
Gunnar Uusi (1931–1981), Estonian chess player

See also
Uusi Runo, poetry collection by Aaro Hellaakoski
Uusi Suomi, Finnish newspaper